Maksim Petrovich Mager (1897 – 16 October 1941) was a Soviet komkor. He was born in what is now Belarus. He fought in the Soviet Red Army during the Russian Civil War. He was a recipient of the Order of Lenin (February 22, 1938) and the Order of the Red Banner.

During the Great Purge, Mager was arrested on September 10, 1938 and released on 9 February 1940. He was later re-arrested on 28 April 1941. As part of the Purge of the Red Army in 1941, he was sentenced to death by the Military Collegium of the Supreme Court of the Soviet Union and executed during the Battle of Moscow.

Bibliography
 
 
 Как ломали НЭП. Стенограммы пленумов ЦК ВКП(б) 1928—1929 гг. в 5-ти тт., Москва, 2000
 Советская историческая энциклопедия, тт. 1 — 16, Москва, 1961—1976
 Сборник лиц, награждённых Орденом Красного Знамени и Почётным Революционным Оружием, Москва, Государственное военное издательство, 1926

External links
 Справочник по истории Коммунистической партии и Советского Союза 1898—1991
 Репрессии в Красной Армии

1897 births
1941 deaths
People from Mogilev District
People from Mogilev Governorate
Old Bolsheviks
Belarusian communists
Soviet komkors
Soviet military personnel of the Russian Civil War
Recipients of the Order of Lenin
Recipients of the Order of the Red Banner
Great Purge victims from Belarus
Soviet rehabilitations